is a passenger railway station in located in the city of Higashiōsaka,  Osaka Prefecture, Japan, operated by the private railway operator Kintetsu Railway.

Lines
Mito Station is served by the Osaka Line, and is located 7.4 rail kilometers from the starting point of the line at Ōsaka Uehommachi Station.

Station layout
The station consists of two ground-level island platform. There is no interconnection between the platforms; passengers wishing to change platforms must exit the station, cross via a level crossing, and re-enter from the opposite side.

Platforms

Adjacent stations

History
Mito Station opened on December 10, 1925.

Passenger statistics
In fiscal 2018, the station was used by an average of 10,299 passengers daily.

Surrounding area
Nagase River
Iyakatana Shrine
Mitsurugi Shrine
Kanaoka Park
Higashi Osaka Municipal Kanaoka Junior High School

See also
List of railway stations in Japan

References

External links

 Mito Station 

Railway stations in Japan opened in 1925
Railway stations in Osaka Prefecture
 Higashiōsaka